Aert de Gelder ( or Arent; October 26, 1645 – August 27, 1727) was a Dutch painter. He was the only Dutch artist to paint in the tradition of Rembrandt's late style into the 18th century.

Biography
De Gelder was born and died in Dordrecht.  He was one of Rembrandt’s last pupils while in Amsterdam, studying in his studio from 1661 to 1663. He was not only one of the most talented of Rembrandt’s pupils, but alsoone of his most devoted followers. Following Rembrandt's lead, de Gelder would paint such works as The Baptism of Christ and Ahimelech Giving the Sword of Goliath to David.  Story telling, transparent emotionalism, and an emphasis on the humanity of biblical characters are the distinguishing elements of his style.

Style

As author of biblical scenes and portraits his style was inspired by Rembrandt's, using his artistic ideas, well into the 18th century, without being influenced by contemporary new fashions. From the artistic point of view his work can not be considered as passive imitation of the master; indeed, it stands for inventiveness in the narrative, taste for the theatrical and a strong emotional charge of the characters. All these traits made him one of the most important interpreters of Dutch painting of the late seventeenth century.

Works
 Esther and Mordecai (Budapest, Museum of Fine Arts}
 Judah and Tamar, c. 1681 (Vienna, Gemäldegalerie of the Academy of Fine Arts)
 King David, c. 1683 (Amsterdam, Rijksmuseum, inv A 2695)
 The Toilet of Esther, c. 1684 (Munich, Alte Pinakothek )
 Portrait of Tsar Peter the Great (Amsterdam, Rijksmuseum?)
 Self Portrait as Zeuxis (Frankfurt am Main, Städel, inv. no. 1015))
 Passion Series c. 1715 (22 paintings, including ten in Aschaffenburg, Schloss Johannisburg, and two in Amsterdam, Rijksmuseum)
 Portrait of Hermannus Boerhaave with his wife and daughter, c. 1724 (Amsterdam, Rijksmuseum, inv A 4034)
 The marriage contract, c. 1670 (Brighton Museum & Art Gallery)
 Simeon's song of praise. 1700–1710 (The Hague, Royal Picture Gallery Mauritshuis)
 Baptism of Christ, c. 1710 (Cambridge, Fitzwilliam Museum)

See also 
 Chiaroscuro

References

External links 
 
 National Gallery, London , "Aert de Gelder"
 Paintings and biography at artbible.info
 Works and literature on Aert de Gelder at PubHist
 Dutch and Flemish paintings from the Hermitage, an exhibition catalog from The Metropolitan Museum of Art (fully available online as PDF), which contains material on Aert de Gelder (cat. no. 9)

1645 births
1727 deaths
Dutch Golden Age painters
Dutch male painters
Artists from Dordrecht
Pupils of Rembrandt